Eveline Luberta "Evelien" Eshuis (born 25 November 1942) is a Dutch politician who was a member of the House of Representatives in the Netherlands from 1982 to 1986. She was the first openly lesbian member of the Dutch Parliament.

Biography
Eshuis was born on 25 November 1942 in Amersfoort, Netherlands. She worked in Ghana for a year in 1968. Eshuis joined the Communist Party of the Netherlands in 1974 and was elected to the House of Representatives in 1982. She came out as lesbian that same year, becoming the first openly lesbian member of Parliament in the Netherlands. Eshuis is described in Trouw as one of the most well-known LGBT politicians in the Netherlands. In Parliament, she regularly wore a pink triangle pin as a symbol of lesbian pride. Eshuis initiated a 1983 inquiry into the shipbuilding company Rijn-Schelde-Verolme after its bankruptcy. After serving one term in the House of Representatives from 1982 to 1986, she became the secretary of the district council of De Pijp. From 1993 to 2002, she was Amstelveen's director of environment and recreation, and has since worked as a consultant. She is a member of the board of Opzij, a feminist magazine.

See also
List of the first LGBT holders of political offices

References

1942 births
20th-century Dutch politicians
20th-century Dutch women politicians
Communist Party of the Netherlands politicians
LGBT members of the Parliament of the Netherlands
Living people
People from Amersfoort
Lesbian politicians